Shanarpatti block is a revenue block in the Dindigul district of Tamil Nadu, India. It has a total of 21 panchayat villages.

List of Village Panchayats in Shanarpatti block
Anjukulipatti
Avilipatti
Emmakalapuram
Kambiliyampatti
Kanavaipatti
Kombaipatti
Koovanuthu
Madur
Marunoothu
Ragalapuram
Rajakkapatti
Sengurichi
Shanarpatti
Silluvathur
T.panchampatti
Thavasimadai
Thimmanallur
Vajira Servaikaran Kottai
V.t.patti
Veerasinnampatti
Vembarpatti

References 
 

Revenue blocks of Dindigul district